Paul Busque is a Canadian politician, who was elected to the National Assembly of Quebec in a by-election on November 9, 2015. He represented the electoral district of Beauce-Sud as a member of the Quebec Liberal Party until his defeat in the 2018 election.

References

Living people
Quebec Liberal Party MNAs
21st-century Canadian politicians
Year of birth missing (living people)
Université Laval alumni